Trace Alexander Tervo (born October 30, 1962) is a sailor who represented the United States Virgin Islands. He competed in the 470 event at the 1984 Summer Olympics.

References

External links
 
 

1962 births
Living people
United States Virgin Islands male sailors (sport)
Olympic sailors of the United States Virgin Islands
Sailors at the 1984 Summer Olympics – 470
Sportspeople from Minnesota